Yogi Babu (born 22 July 1985) is an Indian actor and comedian, who appears in Tamil films. He is a three time Ananda Vikatan Cinema Award winner, he performed in Aandavan Kattalai (2016), Kolamavu Kokila (2018) and Pariyerum Perumal (2018).

Early and personal life
Babu's father was a havildar in the Indian Army, so Babu had to travel alongside a lot as a child, as a result of which he studied in Jammu in the early 1990s.

Babu married Manju Bhargavi on 5 February 2020 in an intimate ceremony held at their ancestral temple in Tiruttani.

Career
Babu worked as an assistant director in the Lollu Sabha, and helping write scenes for two years. He made his feature film debut in the Ameer-starring Yogi (2009) as an aspiring actor and subsequently adapted the name of the film as a prefix for his stage name. He appeared as a goon in Paiyaa. He later appeared in an uncredited role as a pimp in Sundar C.'s Kalakalappu (2012). In 2013, he appeared in his first extended comedy role with Pattathu Yaanai (2013), while he also featured in the Hindi film, Chennai Express alongside Shah Rukh Khan.

He then performed as a comedy rival to Sivakarthikeyan in Maan Karate (2014) and as eerie comedian in Yaamirukka Bayamey (2014). In 2015, he appeared in over a dozen films and won positive reviews for his work in Kaaka Muttai (2015) and Kirumi (2015). Yogi Babu had a breakthrough year in 2016, featuring in 20 films, and winning critical acclaim for his role alongside Vijay Sethupathi in Aandavan Kattalai (2016). This was followed by his role in Kolamavu Kokila (2018) where his one-sided lover portrayal opposite Nayanthara was critically acclaimed while the Kalyana Vayasu song and his antics in it went viral. He appears as supporting character in film Pariyerum Perumal (2018), the film released to positive reviews from critics, with critics praising the comedy and performance of Yogi Babu. He acted for the first time as lead role in Dharmaprabhu (2019) which he play of role of Yamantaka. He played a key role in Gurkha (2019). Babu is a security guard in this hostage drama written and directed by Sam Anton. He has acted with the Superstar Rajinikanth in Darbar (2020).

Starting his career as a comic relief in films starring stars like Rajinikanth, Ajith Kumar and Vijay, he has also played leading roles in small budget films and garnered critical acclaim. In the 2021, political satire Mandela, he played the eponymous character whose single vote would decide the results of the panchayat elections and was very well received.

Filmography

Films

Upcoming projects

Television

References

External links

 

Living people
Tamil male actors
Male actors in Tamil cinema
21st-century Indian male actors
Tamil comedians
Indian male comedians
1985 births